Ronald Webster Park is a sports venue in The Valley, Anguilla. It is currently used mostly for football matches, although most years the Leeward Islands cricket team play one of their matches in the Regional Four Day Competition on this ground. The stadium holds 4,000.

Overview
According to the March 2009 edition of The Wisden Cricketer magazine, the ground "is reputed to have the best pitch in the Caribbean for pace and even bounce. If the rumours are believed, it has something to do with meticulous rolling at night under the light of a full moon".

External links
 Cricinfo Website – Ground Page
 Cricket Archive page

Sports venues in Anguilla
Football venues in Anguilla
Buildings and structures in The Valley, Anguilla